

Top Grossing Films

The top films released in 2012 by worldwide gross are as follows:

Releases

March – May

June – August

Sept – November

See also
 2012 in film
 2012 in Pakistan

References

External links
 Search Pakistani film – IMDB.com

2012
Pakistani
Films